Maulvi Abdul Ghani Faiq is an Afghan Taliban politician who is currently serving as governor of Badakhshan province since 7 November 2021. He is a resident of Badakhshan. He has also served as a member of the negotiation team in Qatar office.

References

Living people
Taliban governors
Governors of Badakhshan Province
Year of birth missing (living people)